This is a list of aviation accidents and incidents that have occurred in Greece.

October 26, 1947: Douglas DC-4 on way from Istanbul to Athens crashes in Hymettus. 44 people died.
December 21, 1948: Douglas C-47 of the Czech Airlines crashes in Kalamata with a death toll of 24.
June 6, 1949: Douglas C-47 of the now defunct National Greek Airlines crashes in Athens. 22 people die.
October 29, 1959: DC3 of the Olympic Airways crashes near Tanagra. 18 people are killed.
October 12, 1967: De Havilland DH.106 Comet of the British European Airways crashes off Rhodes, killing 66 people on board.
December 8, 1969: Douglas DC-6 of the Olympic Airways from Chania to Athens crashes in Keratea. 90 people are killed.
January 12, 1970: Douglas C-47 of the Hellenic Air Force crashes in Vilia, resulting in the death of 23 people.
October 21, 1972: NAMC YS-11 of the Olympic Airways crashes in Athens. 37 people are killed.
July 19, 1972: BAC One-Eleven (this version) 501EX (G-AWYS) of British Caledonian (this version), overrun the runway of Kerkyra (Corfu) Airport during take off and came to a stop in the nearby lagoon. There were no fatalities directly related to the incident, but one elder lady died subsequently from heart attack probably due to the emotional stress.
September 6, 1973: Two Mirage V's of the Belgian Air Force crash into the Lefka Ori mountains within one minute of each other, killing their pilots.
September 8, 1974: TWA Flight 841 crashes into the Ionian Sea. All 79 passengers and 9 crew members were killed.
February 9, 1975: Transall C-160 of Luftwaffe crashes in Chania, killing 40 people.
November 23, 1976: NAMC YS-11 of Olympic Airways from Athens to Kozani crashes under fog into a mountain near Sarantaporo. Fatalities 50.
October 7, 1979: A Douglas DC-8 Swissair Flight 316 lands at Athens Ellinikon International Airport, overshooting the runway and killing fourteen passengers. The plane touches down at too great a speed and too far along the runway for the pilots to use sufficient braking and reverse thrust.
April 2, 1986: TWA Flight 840 is bombed on the way to Athens, sucking out 4 on board. The plane landed safely.
August 3, 1989: Short 330 of the Olympic Airways from Thessaloniki to Samos crashes in the Kerketeus range of mountains. All 34 people on board are killed.
February 5, 1991: The worst accident in the history of the Hellenic Air Force. Lockheed C-130H Hercules 748 crashes into Mount Othrys. 63 were reported killed.
March 24, 1992: A Boeing 707-321C operated by Golden Star Air Cargo crashed into Mount Hymettus on approach to Athens-Ellinikon International Airport. All 7 people on board are killed.
June 18, 1992: A Greek Mirage F-1 engaged in a dogfight to intercept Turkish F-16's crashes into the sea near Agios Efstratios killing its pilot, Lieutenant Nikolaos Sialmas.
January 31, 1996: Bell 212 helicopter of the Greek Navy flying a reconnaissance mission during the Imia crisis crashes over the islets (some speculating due to Turkish fire). The 3 Greek officers aboard the helicopter, Lieutenant Christodoulos Karathanasis, Lieutenant Panagiotis Vlachakos and Master Chief Petty Officer Ektoras Gialopsos died.
December 17, 1997: Yakovlev Yak-42 of the Aerosvit Airlines crashes into the Pierian mountains in Central Macedonia. The exact spot of the crash was discovered 3 days later, cause of the bad weather conditions and the mountainous landscape. 70 people are killed.
December 20, 1997: Lockheed Hercules C-130 of the Hellenic Air Force crashes into Pastra Mountain near Tanagra, cause of bad weather conditions, killing 5 people. The military aircraft was due to transfer soldiers from Tanagra to Pieria, in order to take part in the operations for the discovery of the Ukrainian plane which had crashed 3 days earlier.
September 11, 2004: The helicopter carrying Patriarch Peter VII of Alexandria along with 16 others (including journalists and three other bishops of the Church of Alexandria) crashes into the Aegean Sea while en route to the monastic community of Mount Athos, arguably after an explosion. None survived. The cause of the crash remains unknown.
August 14, 2005: After fears that it could crash in Athens' center, Helios Airways Flight 522 crashes in Grammatiko, killing all 121 people on board. This is the deadliest aviation accident in the history of Greece.
May 23, 2006: A Greek and a Turkish F-16 collide in mid air off the island of Karpathos and crash in the Aegean. The Greek pilot, Captain Kostas Iliakis, is killed.
October 3, 2006: Turkish Airlines Flight 1476 is hijacked in Greek airspace.
August 26, 2010: Two Hellenic Air Force F-16's, a single seater and a two seater, collide mid air during a training exercise south of Crete, near Chrysi. The pilot of the single seater F-16, Captain Tasos Balatsoukas, is killed instantly. The pilots of the two seater F-16 eject, but Captain Sifis Anastasakis' parachute does not open. He was seriously injured and died three days later in the hospital.
February 11, 2016: A Hellenic Navy Bell 212 helicopter crashes during a training exercise on the island of Kinaros, close to Amorgos.
July 16, 2022: A Meridian Flight 3032, an Antonov An-12BK, carrying munitions from Serbia to Bangladesh, via Jordan, Saudi Arabia, and India, crashed near the city of Kavala in northern Greece, killing all eight people on board.
January 30, 2023: A Hellenic Air Force upgraded two-seated F-4E Phantom ΙΙ crashed in the Ionian sea at around 10:30 am, 25 nautical miles (46,3 Km) south of Andravida air base. The aircraft belonged to the 338th Fighter-Bomber Squadron of the 117th Combat Wing based in Andravida. The accident occurred during a training exercise with another F-4E that successfully returned to base, the aircraft that crashed was the No.2 of the flight formation. According to early sources, shortly before the crash the two pilots sent a distress signal that they would abandon the aircraft and use the ejection seats, later it was indicated that none of the pilots ejected from the aircraft. A large search and rescue operation involving helicopters and ships from the Hellenic Air Force, the Hellenic Navy and the Hellenic coast guard was set to find and rescue the pilots. Both the co-pilot Marios Michael Touroutsikas (29 years old) and the captain Efstathios Tsitlakidis (31 years old) were killed. It is still unclear what caused the crash but some speculate that it is due to a technical failure.

References 

2 Greek F-16s collide in mid air. F16.net 
Greek F-16 Collision, 2nd Pilot Dies. Keeptalkinggreece.com 
Aviation accidents in Greece
BBC article
CNN article
ASN Aircraft accident description Yakovlev 42 UR-42334 - Thessaloniki
Death of Patriarch Peter VII of Alexandria